Jelena Trivan (born 4 April 1973) is a Serbian former politician. She served as a Member of the National Assembly of Serbia between 2007 and 2013 and was previously the vice-president of the Democratic Party until 2012, when she resigned. She later left the party in 2014. Since 2018, she has been serving as the President of Board of Directors of the Film Center of Serbia.

Trivan was announced as the new general director of Telekom Srpske (Mtel) from 15 September 2021, replacing Marko Lopičić. Mtel is the second largest telecommunications company in Bosnia and Herzegovina.

References 

1973 births
Living people
Members of the National Assembly (Serbia)
Democratic Party (Serbia) politicians
21st-century Serbian women politicians
21st-century Serbian politicians
Politicians from Mitrovica, Kosovo
Kosovo Serbs
Women members of the National Assembly (Serbia)